BYS may refer to:

 "B.Y.S.", a song from the album Daily Operation by Gang Starr
 Baggio–Yoshinari Syndrome, a tick-borne disease found in Brazil
 Boston Youth Symphony